Sailor Moon: La Luna Splende is a video game released for Nintendo DS by Namco Bandai on 16 March 2011 for the Italian market only. The title is inspired by the anime series Sailor Moon, and although the title of the video game refers to the Italian title of the second season, its plot and player characters are specific to the first season.

Plot 
Sailor Moon and the other Sailor Guardians set out on an adventure in which they will have to save Naru Osaka, Usagi's best friend, who has fallen into a deep sleep from which she can no longer emerge, which turns out to be a trap set by the Dark Kingdom.

Gameplay 
The player must select from one of the five protagonists to complete the video game, which is divided into three main phases: the Jewel Palace, the Mystery Castle and the Flower Garden, each of which consists of 20-30 levels. The levels combine elements of platform action video games with others of puzzle video games.

Some in-game content can be unlocked by the player through progression, such as character customization with accessories.

References 

2011 video games
Action video games
Europe-exclusive video games
Platform games
Puzzle video games
Single-player video games
La Luna Splende
Nintendo DS games